The Mirror Has Two Faces is a 1996 American romantic comedy-drama film produced and directed by Barbra Streisand, who also stars. The screenplay by Richard LaGravenese is loosely based on the 1958 French film Le Miroir à deux faces written by André Cayatte and Gérard Oury. Also starring are Jeff Bridges, Pierce Brosnan, George Segal, Mimi Rogers, Brenda Vaccaro, and Lauren Bacall. The story focuses on a shy, middle-aged professor who enters into a platonic relationship with an unlucky colleague.

The film was released on November 15, 1996 and grossed $82 million worldwide. Streisand, Marvin Hamlisch, Robert John "Mutt" Lange, and Bryan Adams composed the film's theme song, "I Finally Found Someone". Streisand sang it on the soundtrack with Adams.

Plot
Rose Morgan, a middle-aged English literature professor at Columbia University, lives with her vain, overbearing mother, Hannah. While attending her sister Claire's third wedding (to Rose's former boyfriend Alex), Rose tells her best friend, Doris that she has reached the point where she knows she will never get married. But she also thinks how wonderful it might feel to have a partner who really knows her.

Gregory Larkin is a Columbia mathematics professor who cannot connect with students and loses perspective as soon as he is aroused by an attractive woman. A few moments after Gregory begins a talk about his new book, his ex-girlfriend Candace arrives. She flusters him so much that he has a panic attack and is unable to continue. While recovering, Gregory begs his best friend, Henry, not to let him go home with Candace, but he leaves with her the moment she offers. Back at Gregory's place, Candace leaves immediately after having sex. She is still with her new boyfriend, but wanted to bolster her ego because he was cheating on her.

Left in a state of frustration and rejection, Gregory decides to place a personal ad that reads, "Columbia University professor (male) seeks woman interested in common goals and companionship. Must have Ph.D. and be over thirty-five. Physical appearance not important!"

Claire secretly responds to the ad for Rose, and that night Gregory asks Rose out to dinner. They begin a relationship akin to dating, but without any physical intimacy beyond an occasional hug. Three months later, Gregory proposes. He emphasizes that their relationship will be built on common interest and caring, not sex, though he does agree to occasional sex, provided Rose gives him enough warning. Gregory and Rose marry in a courthouse ceremony. The relationship continues to grow and become more emotionally intimate, with hints of physical attraction.

While discussing his book tour at breakfast, Rose asks if now is enough warning to tell him she would like to have sex tonight. She tries to make the scene seductive, while he tries to keep it benign. They end up passionately on the floor, until Gregory resists and pulls away. He expresses disappointment in her, calling her behavior "female manipulation", without admitting he only stopped because he was being swept away. Hours later, while Gregory is asleep, a devastated Rose sneaks out and goes back to her mother's.

During her stay with her mother, she is handed a photograph of herself as a little girl. Her mother describes how pretty she was back then, and that her father had never held a baby, until she came along. He "never let her go," Hannah told Rose. This greatly changes Rose's view about herself: "I was pretty?" After this, Rose decides to undergo a makeover (changes her diet, exercises, does her hair, starts wearing curve-favoring clothing and makeup). Meanwhile, missing his wife, Gregory cuts his European book tour short and comes home to Rose. However, when he tells Rose he doesn't like the changes, she tells him that she cannot continue being married, moving back in with her mother.

When Alex finds Claire in bed with her masseur, they separate. Rose comforts him, but she realizes the fantasy of Alex is a lot better than the reality. Gregory starts lashing out at students, distraught about his failing marriage. He ends up on Henry's couch, an emotional and physical wreck, insisting he loves Rose and does not know what to do. Henry encourages him to fight for her.

Before sunrise, Gregory goes to Rose's apartment. He tells Rose he loves her and he so desperately wanted her that night, it caused him to pull away. They mutually confess their love and, when Gregory says he wants to marry her, she reminds him that they are still married. The sun comes up, and they catch a taxi home.

Cast

 Barbra Streisand as Rose Morgan-Larkin
 Jeff Bridges as Gregory Larkin
 Lauren Bacall as Hannah Morgan
 George Segal as Henry Fine
 Mimi Rogers as Claire Morgan
 Pierce Brosnan as Alex
 Brenda Vaccaro as Doris
 Austin Pendleton as Barry
 Elle Macpherson as Candace
 Taina Elg as Professor
 Adam LeFevre as Doorman
 Andrew Parks as Waiter
 Leslie Stefanson as Sara Myers
 Milla Jovovich as Girl in Commercial (uncredited)
 Allelon Ruggiero as a lit student (uncredited)

Release 
The film grossed $41 million in the US and Canada.

Reception 
Rotten Tomatoes, a review aggregator, reports that 54% of 35 surveyed critics the film a positive review; the average rating is 5.9/10.

In her review in The New York Times, Janet Maslin called the film's first hour "light and amusing" but added, "then [Barbra Streisand] impresses her audience with good will hubris that goes through the roof. Beguiling as she can be in ugly duckling roles, she becomes insufferable as this story's gloating swan . . . The overkill of The Mirror Has Two Faces is partly offset by Ms. Streisand's genuine diva appeal. The camera does love her, even with a gun to its head. And she's able to wring sympathy and humor from the first half of this role. The film also has a big asset in Ms. Bacall . . [who delivers] her lines with trademark tart panache . . . and cuts an elegant and sardonic figure".

Roger Ebert of the Chicago Sun-Times said the film "approaches the subject of marriage warily and with wit, like a George Bernard Shaw play . . . it's rare to find a film that deals intelligently with issues of sex and love, instead of just assuming that everyone on the screen and in the audience shares the same popular culture assumptions. It's rare, too, to find such verbal characters in a movie, and listening to them talk is one of the pleasures of The Mirror Has Two Faces . . . this is a moving and challenging movie".

In the San Francisco Chronicle, Edward Guthmann described the film as "a silly affirmation fantasy . . . that Streisand  . . . uses to prove she's really beautiful, funny and worthy of being loved, gosh darn it . . . hasn't she returned to the theme of Homely Girl Redeemed, and crowned herself the victor, countless times? Look back and you'll see that Streisand's career, from the beginning, was one long battle cry for geeks and wallflowers and Jewish girls with big noses - a series of wish-fulfillment scenarios in which she, the perennial underdog, triumphs by dint of talent, chutzpah and a really great personality . . . in its first half The Mirror is a romantic-comic delight: nicely directed . . . well-acted by a terrific cast and peppered with great one-liners . . . by the second half . . . the movie has disintegrated into a humorless, drawn-out plea for reassurance".

Todd McCarthy of Variety called it "a vanity production of the first order. A staggeringly obsessive expression of the importance of appearances, good looks and being adored, Barbra Streisand's third directorial outing is also, incidentally, a very old-fashioned wish-fulfillment romantic comedy that has been directed and performed in the broadest possible manner . . . From the beginning, it is clear that Streisand intends to hit every point squarely on the head and maybe bang it a few extra times for good measure. Every gag, every line and every emotional cue is pitched to the top balcony so no one will miss a thing, and there are quite a few moments of self-examination and discovery where one nearly expects the star to break into song to underline what she is really feeling . . . the subject of the director's uninterrupted gaze. Lit and posed in an old-time movie star way you rarely see anymore, she plays out her career-long is-she-or-isn't-she-beautiful comic psychodrama one more time, with the girlish uncertainties wiped out with the speed of a costume change. If one were to take it all seriously, one would have to point out that there just isn't that much difference in Rose Before and After, that Streisand hasn't allowed herself to look unappealing enough to justify the big change. No matter. The narcissism on display is astonishing to behold, and veteran Barbra worshipers will have a field day. Beyond that, pic does deliver a number of laughs, deep-dish luxury on the production side and an engagingly enthusiastic performance from Bridges".

Lisa Schwarzbaum of Entertainment Weekly rated the film C- and added, "We know these two people are lonely and afraid of love and deserve our empathy. But they enact their tightly choreographed pas de deux in such a hermetically sealed universe that our emotions can never be engaged. Instead, we are left to muse, "Oy vey, does Streisand know how over-the-top she is?" That's not to say that Mirror is difficult to sit through. The synthetic one-liners that pass for humor and sentiment . . . are struck regularly, like gongs . . . The settings are pretty. The music is slick".

In The Washington Post, Rita Kempley called the film "Barbra Streisand's latest folly" and added, "Although meant to be a bubbly romantic comedy, the movie is actually a very public tragedy for Streisand, who still can't quite believe that she's not Michelle Pfeiffer . . . at 54, it's time to get over girlish hang-ups, forget the noble schnoz and thank God that unlike Cher, you're still recognizable".

In the newspaper's Weekend section, Desson Howe opined, "For Streisand fans, this ugly-duckling parable . . . is going to be the perfect experience. But for those who make crucifix signs with their fingers when her name is mentioned, this is definitely one to miss . . . the running time is hardly helped by a plethora of strategically framed shots of Rose's legs, new hairstyle, luscious lips and misty-blue eyes, after she has undergone a physical makeover. There is comic relief, however, from Lauren Bacall as Hannah, Rose’s egocentric, materialistic mother. Her withering lines . . . counteract some of the ubiquitous narcissism".

Lauren Bacall's performance earned praise, winning her the Golden Globe Award and Screen Actors Guild Award for Best Supporting Actress. She also earned an Academy Award nomination for Best Supporting Actress, the first in her then-50-plus year career.

Awards and nominations

The film is recognized by American Film Institute in these lists:
 2004: AFI's 100 Years...100 Songs:	
 "I Finally Found Someone" – Nominated

Soundtrack
Original music for the film was composed by Marvin Hamlisch. It received a nomination for Best Original Score at the 54th Golden Globe Awards. On November 12, 1996, Sony released the soundtrack on CD.

Tracks include "Try a Little Tenderness" by David Sanborn, "The Power Inside of Me" by Richard Marx, "I Finally Found Someone" by Barbra Streisand and Bryan Adams, "All of My Life" by Barbra Streisand and "The Apology / Nessun Dorma" by Luciano Pavarotti with the London Philharmonic Orchestra conducted by Zubin Mehta. In the final scene, Pavarotti's voice was mimed by real-life tenor and actor Carlo Scibelli.

The CD single for "I Finally Found Someone" also contains the Spanish-language version of Streisand's "Evergreen": "Siempre Verde (Tema de Amor de Nace Una Estrella)".

References

External links

 
 
 
 
 
 Barbra Archives: The Mirror Has Two Faces film
 Barbra Archives: The Mirror Has Two Faces: Music From the Motion Picture

1990s English-language films
1990s American films
1996 films
1996 romantic comedy-drama films
1996 comedy films
1996 drama films
American romantic comedy-drama films
Films directed by Barbra Streisand
American remakes of French films
Films scored by Marvin Hamlisch
Films featuring a Best Supporting Actress Golden Globe-winning performance
Films set in New York City
Films set in Columbia University
Phoenix Pictures films
TriStar Pictures films
Films produced by Barbra Streisand
Films set in universities and colleges
Films produced by Arnon Milchan